The 2021 Kirklees Metropolitan Borough Council election took place on 6 May 2021 to elect members of Kirklees Metropolitan Borough Council in England. This was on the same day as other local elections. One-third of the seats were up for election, with two wards Almondbury (Birstall & Birkenshaw and Golcar) electing two councillors. In November 2020, 3 Labour Councillors resigned in protest over the handling of the suspension of Jeremy Corbyn. This resulted in Labour losing overall control of Kirklees Council.

Results

Ward results

Almondbury

Ashbrow

Batley East

Batley West

Birstall and Birkenshaw

Cleckheaton

Colne Valley

Crosland Moor and Netherton

Dalton

Denby Dale

Dewsbury East

Dewsbury South

Dewsbury West

Golcar

Greenhead

Heckmondwike

Holme Valley North

Holme Valley South

Kirkburton

Lindley

Liversedge and Gomersal

Mirfield

Newsome

References 

Kirklees
Kirklees Council elections